Cara-Beth Burnside, nicknamed "CB" (born July 23, 1971 in Orange, California, United States), is a professional skateboarder and snowboarder and ranks amongst the top female athletes in these sports in the world. She was the first president of the Action Sports Alliance.

Skateboarding Career
Burnside started skating in men's amateur skating competitions in the 1980s due to the lack of women's skate contests.  During this time, Burnside started to learn to snowboard due to the lack of professional opportunities for female skaters.

As a skateboarder, Burnside has won more than 16 titles in competitions such as the X Games, All Girl Skate Jam, Vans Triple Crown, Slam City Jam and Soul Bowl, and in 2004 she was named Female Vert Skater of the Year by World Cup Skating.  She has received a total of 5 Summer X Games medals for skateboarding.

In 1989, Burnside became the first woman to appear on the cover of Thrasher Magazine and in 1999, she became the first woman to have a signature skate shoe.

Burnside was named TransWorld Skateboarding's female vert skater of the year in 2004.

In 2015, Burnside was inducted in to the Skateboarding Hall of Fame.

Snowboarding Career
Burnside was on the first United States Olympic snowboarding team at the 1998 Winter Olympics in Nagano, Japan, where she placed 4th. She has also won titles at the snowboarding Grand Prix, the X Games and the Vans Triple Crown.

She has received a total of 3 Winter X Games medals for snowboarding.

Personal life

Burnside is an advocate for opportunities in women's sports and founded the Action Sports Alliance in 2005 to create more professional opportunities for women in sports.  The Action Sports Alliance also helped secure equal pay for women at the X Games.

Burnside is a vegetarian.

Filmography

She is featured in the beginning and end titles for the documentary film Not Bad for a Girl.

Video Game Appearances

Burnside is a playable character in the video games Grind Session and Tony Hawk: Ride.

References

External links
 Girls Skate Network Interview

American skateboarders
American female snowboarders
Female skateboarders
Living people
X Games athletes
1971 births
Sportspeople from Orange, California
Snowboarders at the 1998 Winter Olympics
Olympic snowboarders of the United States
21st-century American women
University of California, Davis alumni